Martha Hackett (born February 21, 1961) is an American actress. She is known for her portrayal of Seska in thirteen episodes of the television series Star Trek: Voyager. Hackett is an alumna of Harvard University/Radcliffe College, and was married to independent filmmaker Tim Disney.

Career
Hackett's first experience of Star Trek was when she auditioned for the role of Jadzia Dax in Star Trek: Deep Space Nine, but lost out to Terry Farrell. She subsequently was cast as a member of the Terellian alien species in the finale of Star Trek: The Next Generation, "All Good Things...". She appeared on Deep Space Nine as the Romulan Sub Commander T'Rul in the two-part episode "The Search" in season three.

She was cast in Star Trek: Voyager in the recurring role of Seska, a Bajoran member of the Maquis crew who joined Voyager after it was stranded in the Delta Quadrant. She first appeared in the episode "Parallax" where she wore the blue uniform of a Starfleet science officer; this was later revealed to be a costuming error and she was subsequently seen in the uniform of the operations department. The original uniform sold for $1,276 ($ today) in the "It's a Wrap!" auction on eBay in 2008.

When she was first cast in the role of Seska, she was not informed that she was a Cardassian spy. She later explained that "when I first started I was Seska the Bajoran Maquis member and they sort of worked everything else up in soap opera fashion." Hackett became pregnant, which was written into Seska's character. Hackett described Seska as being a character with several layers, saying that "Seska’s darker sides came from a certain emotional instability, at least that’s how I played her." Seska was killed off in the second part of "Basics", which came as a surprise to Hackett as she was previously sent a version of the script where Seska survived, but her baby died. She was only told that Seska was to die less than a day before filming. Following her character's death, Hackett as Seska returned to Voyager twice more in the episodes "Worst Case Scenario" and "Shattered". She appeared in a total of thirteen episodes of Voyager.

In 2001, she appeared in the independent film Question of Faith, where she played the monk Anselm. Her character underwent a sex change from male to female as part of a divine miracle. The film was directed by her husband.

In 2018, she appeared on the game show To Tell the Truth.

Personal life
Hackett was married to Tim Disney, and they have two sons together. Hackett has an A.B. cum laude from Harvard University/Radcliffe College.

Filmography

Film

Television

Video games

References

External links
 
marthahackettofficial.com
 
 

1961 births
American film actresses
American television actresses
Living people
Actresses from Boston
Radcliffe College alumni
21st-century American women